Huang Chuang (born 2 January 1997) is a Chinese footballer currently playing as a defender for Henan Jianye.

Club career
As a youth Huang Chuang was selected to train with Portuguese football club Gondomar as part of a Chinese Football Association sponsored youth development program. He would remain with the club and was promoted to their senior team where he would make his debut on 18 December 2016 in a league game against C.D. Cinfães in a 1-0 victory.

Career statistics

.

References

External links

1997 births
Living people
Chinese footballers
China youth international footballers
Chinese expatriate footballers
Association football defenders
Campeonato de Portugal (league) players
Chinese Super League players
Gondomar S.C. players
Tianjin Jinmen Tiger F.C. players
Henan Songshan Longmen F.C. players
Chinese expatriate sportspeople in Portugal
Expatriate footballers in Portugal